The Life and Adventures of Nicholas Nickleby is a nine-hour adaptation of the novel by Charles Dickens. It is a recording of the stage play  by The Royal Shakespeare Company at The Old Vic in London. It was Channel 4's first major drama commission.

Plot
For a detailed plot, see The Life and Adventures of Nicholas Nickleby.

Cast

Roger Rees as Nicholas Nickleby
Emily Richard as Kate Nickleby
Jane Downs as Mrs. Nickleby
John Woodvine as Ralph Nickleby
Edward Petherbridge as Newman Noggs
David Threlfall as Smike
Alun Armstrong as Wackford Squeers
Suzanne Bertish as Fanny Squeers
Bob Peck as John Browdie
Nicholas Gecks as Lord Verisopht
Christopher Benjamin as Vincent Crummles
David Lloyd Meredith as Charles Cheeryble 
Christopher Ravenscroft as Frank Cheeryble 
Jeffrey Dench as Arthur Gride
Lucy Gutteridge as Madeleine Bray

Awards

This production won the Outstanding Miniseries Primetime Emmy Award. It was also nominated for the following Primetime Emmy awards: Outstanding Achievement in Hairstyling, Outstanding  Art Direction for a Limited Series or a Special, and Outstanding Individual Achievement - Graphic Design and Title Sequences. Roger Rees was nominated for Outstanding Lead Actor in a Miniseries or a Movie, David Threlfall was nominated for Outstanding Supporting Actor in a Miniseries or a Movie and David Edgar (playwright) was nominated for Outstanding Writing for a Miniseries, Movie, or Dramatic Special.

References

External links

 

British drama films
Films based on Nicholas Nickleby
Films directed by Jim Goddard
Primetime Emmy Award for Outstanding Miniseries winners
Television series set in the 1830s
Television shows based on works by Charles Dickens
1980s English-language films
1980s British films